Wechiau is a small town and is the capital of Wa West district, a district in the Upper West Region of north Ghana adjacent to the border with Burkina Faso.
Wechiau has a stretch of the Black Volta and this is the home to a wild population of Hippopotamus.

Tourism 
Wechiau Community Hippo Sanctuary.

References

External links

Populated places in the Upper West Region